Knowlton's Rangers was a reconnaissance and espionage detachment of the Continental Army established by George Washington. Named after its commander, Thomas Knowlton, the unit was formed in 1776.

History

On August 12, 1776, General of the Army George Washington promoted Knowlton to lieutenant colonel. He was ordered to select a group of 130 men and 20 officers from Connecticut, Rhode Island, and Massachusetts regiments to carry out reconnaissance missions. The famous American spy, Captain Nathan Hale, of Coventry, Connecticut, was under the command of Lieutenant Colonel Thomas Knowlton. Besides providing tactical intelligence, Knowlton's Rangers, outfitted as a regiment of light infantry, took part in several battles of the American Revolutionary War. That is why Knowlton's Rangers are considered the predecessor to modern special forces units such as Army Rangers, Delta Force, and other special operations units.

Battle of Harlem Heights

On September 16, 1776, Knowlton's Rangers were scouting in advance of Washington's Army at Harlem Heights, New York. While reconnoitering the British outposts they were engaged by elements of the light infantry brigade commanded by  Major General Alexander Leslie.  The rangers managed a successful retreat and later mounted a counter attack with the support of three companies of Weedon's Regiment led by Major Andrew Leitch. General Washington ordered Knowlton to fall on the enemy's rear, while a feint in front engaged the British troops' attention. The attacking force turned prematurely and made contact with the  British right flank instead, losing the element of surprise. In the face of heavy enemy fire, Knowlton rallied his troops to carry on the attack. He fell mortally wounded in front of his men; Leitch was also wounded and died in a few days. Knowlton's loss was lamented by Washington in his general orders for September 17, 1776 with the statement, "The gallant and brave Col Knowlton, ... would have been an Honor to any Country, having fallen yesterday, while gloriously fighting...". Captain Stephen Brown succeeded Knowlton in command of the unit.

Battle of Fort Washington

Knowlton's Rangers were a part of Fort Washington's garrison, defending the last stronghold of the Continental Army in Manhattan. On November 16, 1776, yielding to prevailing force, American troops surrendered and were taken as prisoners of war.

Legacy
Knowlton's Rangers are considered the United States of America's first organized intelligence service organization, as well as the first American Ranger unit formed after America declared its independence from the United Kingdom. The date "1776" on the modern U.S. Army's intelligence service seal refers to the formation of Knowlton's Rangers.

The Order of Knowlton's Rangers at the Pennsylvania State University raises awareness about history and traditions of the unit.

See also
 Francis Marion
 List of American Revolutionary War battles
 List of George Washington articles

References

External links
 George Washington's Commandos: Special Ops During the American Revolution, The National Interest

United States Army Rangers
American Revolutionary War
Military units and formations established in 1776
Special forces